Lorenzo Villoresi (born 1956) is a perfumer in Florence, Italy. His study and travel in the Middle East has greatly influenced his work and some of his most important fragrances are Orientals, exotic perfumes of spices, amber, incense, resins, vanilla, sandalwoods and other aromatics. He continues in the long tradition of perfumery in Florence, arguably where modern perfume making began.  The LV house opened in 1990 in the 15th-century family palace, overlooking the Arno.

He is best known for his custom-made fragrances and potpourris, and distinguished in that he is an independent perfumer, working outside the big fragrance houses (e.g., Hermès, Chanel, etc.).  Villoresi was the recipient of the prestigious Prix François Coty in 2006, an "Oscar" award to 'artistes parfumeurs', recognizing perfumers' achievements over their career as well as their most recent creations.

He is the author of several books on the art of perfume: 
 Il Profumo: Cultura, storia e tecniche (Firenze: Ponte alle Grazie, 1995) -.
 The book contains descriptions of perfumery techniques, an overview of raw materials and essences, separate chapters on the history of perfume and famous perfume quotes in literature, a special section dedicated to aromatherapy, and an extensive glossary.
 L'arte del bagno: una guida al più sensuale rito del corpo  (Firenze: Ponte alle Grazie, 2001) -.
 L'arte del bagno. Ricette e segreti per la cura, il piacere, la bellezza  (Firenze: Ponte alle Grazie, 1996) -.
 Il Mondo del Profumo (Edited by Villoresi. Milan: RCS Libri & Grandi Opere, 1996/97 - 70 booklets in 3 volumes)

Promoting the culture and artistry of perfume, he is involved with the Pitti Immagine's FRAGRANZE conferences, an annual event bringing together perfumers worldwide, dedicated to the art and culture of fine perfumes.  Villoresi is also involved in the founding of L'Accademia dell’Arte del Profumo—Academy of Perfume Arts—in Florence.  It will "host courses, events, seminars, a fragrance library and everything else that has ties to the world of fragrance." 

Notable creations of his "fragranze fantasia" line include:
 Piper Nigrum (1999), "reminiscent of the spice route and his memories of African markets."
Dilmun (2000), "the mythical Mesopotamian paradise, a vision of sun and citrus fruits, a memory of the evocative legends he heard during his studies."
 Teint de Neige (2000), "the Belle Époque...the rosy hue of a powdered face. The unmistakable scent of perfumed powders, the fragrance of face powder, the perfume of talc, a soft, gentle, enveloping eau de toilette."
 Yerbamate (2001), "an endless expanse of grass and wild flowers, reflecting his love of nature and wide open spaces, of the tea and maté ceremonies."
Alamut (2006), "a sumptuous oriental-style perfume characterised by warm sensual notes and highly precious flowers, on a rich base of rare exotic woods. Alamut evokes the legends of the Near East, enchanted fortresses overflowing with delights, the Thousand and One Nights, the Gulistan and the flowers and scents of secret gardens."

References

External links 
 
 L'Accademia dell’Arte del Profumo

Perfumers
Lorenzo Villoresi
Living people
1956 births